"Romanesque" is the seventh single of J-pop duo FictionJunction Yuuka. It was released on April 18, 2007.

This single includes the ending song of the anime El Cazador de la Bruja, composed by Yuki Kajiura.

This single peaked at #23 on the Oricon weekly charts.

Track listing

 romanesque
 
 romanesque（without vocal）

Charts 
Oricon Sales Chart (Japan)

(*): Sales after 2 weeks

References

External links 
Victor Animation Network: discography entry

2007 singles
FictionJunction Yuuka songs
Songs written by Yuki Kajiura
2007 songs
Victor Entertainment singles